Tavija (Cyrillic: Тавија) is a village in the municipality of Kostajnica, Republika Srpska, Bosnia and Herzegovina.

References

Populated places in Bosnia and Herzegovina